Pepromene is a goddess and being of fate/destiny in Greek mythology (a being of "the destined share", which implies a person's true calling and fate; in short, the idea that every man is tied to a destiny). The ancient perception of her being gives the name as belonging within other Greek ideas (or "seeings") for destiny and fate (such as Aesa, Moira, Moros, Ananke, Adrasteia and Heimarmene).

Etymology
Pepromene's name is speculated to have numerous different origins; some postulate it is derived from the Greek , peprosthai, meaning "to be furnished, fulfilled or fated". However, others suggest that the same πεπερατοσθαι (pepratosthai) means "finite", implying finite nature; the fact that nothing in this life lasts forever.

References

Sources
 Smith, Dictionary of Greek and Roman Biography and Mythology, v. 3, page 184
 The Moirai (The Fates)
 Greek and Roman Religion: a source book
 Cosmology of the Stoa
 http://bearsite.info/General/World_Literature/greek/plutarch/essays.txt (The Complete Works Volume 3, Essays and Miscellanies, by Plutarch)

Greek goddesses
Personifications in Greek mythology
Time and fate goddesses